Eun-ha, also spelled Un-ha, is a Korean feminine given name. Its meaning differs based on the hanja used to write each syllable of the name. There are 30 hanja with the reading "eun" and 30 hanja with the reading "ha" on the South Korean government's official list of hanja which may be registered for use in given names. One way of writing this name in hanja (literally "silver river") is also the Korean name for the Milky Way.

People with this name include:
Shim Eun-ha (born 1972), South Korean actress
Kim Eun-ha (born 1975), South Korean tennis player
Jeoun Eun-ha (born 1993), South Korean football player
Eunha (singer) (born Jung Eun-bi, 1997), South Korean singer, member of girl group Viviz

Fictional characters with this name include:
Cho Eun-ha, in 2003 South Korean television series Love Letter
Eun-ha, in 2005 South Korean film You Are My Sunshine
Seo Eun-ha, in 2005 South Korean television series Resurrection
Baek Eun-ha, in 2020 South Korean television series Flower Of Evil

See also
List of Korean given names
Unha (disambiguation)

References

Korean feminine given names